Perisama is a brush-footed butterfly genus found in the Neotropical realm, ranging from Colombia and Venezuela to Argentina.

Species 
Listed alphabetically by group and within groups:

The alicia species group:
Perisama alicia (Hewitson, 1868) — Alice's Pericloud
Perisama cabirnia (Hewitson, 1874)
Perisama comnena (Hewitson, 1868)
Perisama emma Oberthür, 1916
Perisama gisco Godman & Salvin, 1880
Perisama guerini C. & R. Felder, [1867]
Perisama humboldtii (Guérin-Méneville, [1844])
Perisama ilia Röber, 1915
Perisama nevada Attal & Crosson du Cormier, 1996
Perisama tringa (Guenée, 1872)
Perisama vitringa (Hewitson, 1858)
Perisama yeba (Hewitson, 1857)

The bomplandii species group:
 Perisama bomplandii (Guérin-Méneville, [1844])
Perisama morona (Hewitson, 1868)
Perisama moronina Röber, 1915

The canoma species group:
Perisama canoma Druce, 1874 – Manu Pericloud
Perisama satanas Attal & Crosson du Cormier, 1996

The dorbignyi species group:
Perisama aldasi Attal & Crosson du Cormier, 1996
Perisama dorbignyi (Guérin-Méneville, [1844])
Perisama jurinei (Guenée, 1872) – Cyan-banded Pericloud
Perisama patara (Hewitson, 1855

The lebasii species group:
Perisama ambatensis Oberthür, 1916
Perisama calamis (Hewitson, 1869)
Perisama hilara Salvin, 1869
Perisama koenigi Descimon & Mast de Maeght, 1995
Perisama lanice (Hewitson, 1868)
Perisama lebasii (Guérin-Méneville, [1844])

The oppelii species group:
Perisama oppelii (Latreille, [1809])
Perisama xanthica (Hewitson, 1868)

The paralicia species group:
Perisama paralicia Fruhstorfer, 1916

The philinus species group:
Perisama philinus Doubleday, [1849]
Perisama tristrigosa Butler, 1873 – Butler's Pericloud

The tryphena species group:
Perisama affinis Attal & Crosson du Cormier, 1996
Perisama antioquia Attal & Crosson du Cormier, 1996
Perisama cloelia (Hewitson, 1868)
Perisama goeringi Druce, 1875
Perisama hazarma (Hewitson, 1877)
Perisama ouma Dognin, 1891
Perisama tryphena (Hewitson, 1857) — Straw-vented Pericloud
Perisama typhania Oberthür, 1916

Unknown taxa:
Perisama amyntichus Doubleday, 1849

References

Biblidinae
Nymphalidae of South America
Taxa named by Edward Doubleday
Nymphalidae genera